Benjamin John Day (born 11 December 1978 in Corinda, Queensland) is an Australian professional road racing cyclist, who rode professionally between 2002 and 2014.

Major results

2002
 1st Stage 5 (ITT) Volta ao Alentejo
2003
 1st  Time trial, National Road Championships
2004
 1st Stage 5 Tour Down Under
2005
 1st GP Zwevezele
 5th Overall Tour of Britain
2006
 2nd Time trial, Commonwealth Games
2007
 1st Overall Tour de Beauce
1st Sprints classification
1st Stage 4a (ITT)
 8th Overall Tour of California
2008
 2nd Boulevard Road Race
 3rd Time trial, National Road Championships
 3rd Overall Herald Sun Tour
 3rd Overall San Dimas Stage Race
 6th Overall Tour of Missouri
2009
 1st Overall Callville Bay Classic
1st Stage 1
 1st Boulevard Road Race
 3rd Overall Redlands Bicycle Classic
1st Stage 1 (ITT)
 4th Overall Tour of Tasmania
1st Stage 6
 8th Overall Tour de Beauce
2010
 1st Overall Tour de Beauce
 1st Overall San Dimas Stage Race
1st Stage 1
 1st Overall Redlands Bicycle Classic
1st Stage 1 (ITT)
 1st Chrono Gatineau
 5th Overall Joe Martin Stage Race
2013
 6th Overall Tour de Beauce
2014
 10th Overall Tour of the Gila

References

External links
 
 

1978 births
Living people
Australian male cyclists
Sportsmen from Queensland
Cyclists from Brisbane
Commonwealth Games medallists in cycling
Commonwealth Games silver medallists for Australia
Cyclists at the 2006 Commonwealth Games
20th-century Australian people
21st-century Australian people
Medallists at the 2006 Commonwealth Games